Recep Tayyip Erdoğan was a Mayor of Istanbul and is the 1st leader of the Justice and Development Party and the 25th Prime Minister of the Republic of Turkey. He has been involved in many elections on local, leadership and nationwide stage since his first election to the Grand National Assembly in 1986.

Local elections, 1994

General election, 2002

By-election, 2003

Local elections, 2004

General election, 2007

Constitutional referendum, 2007

Local elections, 2009

Constitutional referendum, 2010

General election, 2011

Presidential election, 2014

Presidential election, 2018

Local elections, 2019

See also 
 Elections in Turkey
 Prime Minister of Turkey

References 

Recep Tayyip Erdoğan
Erdogan, Recep Tayyip